is a Japanese football manager and former player. He played for Japan national team. He was a physical forward and the Japanese media and fans dubbed him as the Cannon of Asia.

Club career
Takagi was educated at and played for Kunimi High School and Osaka University of Commerce. After finishing the university in 1990, he joined Japan Soccer League side Fujita Industries (current Shonan Bellmare). He moved to Mazda (current Sanfrecce Hiroshima) in 1991 and was awarded the JSL Young Player of the Year in 1992. His partnership with Czech Ivan Hašek up front was so successful that Hiroshima won the second stage of J1 League in 1994.

Due to financial difficulties, Hiroshima was forced to release their key players including Takagi in 1998. He moved to Verdy Kawasaki. He was then transferred to J2 League side Consadole Sapporo in 2000 and retired there at the end of the season.

International career
Takagi was capped 44 times and scored 27 goals for the Japan national team. He made his international debut in a friendly against Argentina on May 31, 1992 at the Tokyo National Stadium, the first match under Hans Ooft's reign. He scored his first international goal in a Dynasty Cup match against China on August 24, 1992 in Beijing. He became the ace striker for Ooft's Japan national team.

He was a member of the Japan team that won the 1992 AFC Asian Cup. He scored the lone goal in the final against Saudi Arabia and even though he is said to be awarded the Most Valuable Player of the competition, this is not true. The honor went to his team mate Kazuyoshi Miura. Takagi wasn't even elected into the Tournament Best Eleven.

He was also a member of the Japan squad who participated in the 1994 FIFA World Cup qualification for the 1994 FIFA World Cup. He was suspended for the crucial last match that the Japanese fans now refer to as the Agony of Doha, and watched from the bench a late Iraqi equaliser dashed Japan's hope to qualify for the finals in the USA.

He also took part in the 1996 AFC Asian Cup hosted by UAE. He played three games and scored one goal against Syria in the competition.

Coaching career

Until 2004
After finishing his playing career, he worked as a soccer commentator on television. He also acquired the S-Class Coaching License that was a prerequisite to manage a J.League club in 2004.

Yokohama FC
At the beginning of 2006, he was appointed an assistant coach at Yokohama FC. He was unexpectedly promoted to the manager of the club to replace Yusuke Adachi who was sacked only after the team lost to Ehime FC in the opening match of the season. Takagi's lack of coaching experience and untimely dismissal of Adachi worried the fans who decided in protest to watch the second match of the season (the first match under Takagi) in silence.

However, Takagi quickly convinced the supporters as he guided the club unbeaten for the first fifteen matches under his reign. This was the record unbeaten run since appointment of a new manager in J.League. The club made another J.League record when they did not concede any goal for 770 consecutive minutes by breaking Shimizu S-Pulse's 731 minutes recorded in 1993. They kept 7 consecutive clean sheets which was also a tied J2 League record.

Yokohama FC, who had been languishing in the bottom half of the standing previous 5 seasons since their accession to J2, won the title and gained the first-ever promotion to J1 League.

The club made a drastic change in their squad before the beginning of the 2007 season in preparation for the fight in the top-flight. Eleven players left while another eleven joined the club. Those who left included the striking partners Shoji Jo and Alemão who scored 30 goals together out of club's 61 goals in the previous season. Long-serving Tomotaka Kitamura and Tsuyoshi Yoshitake also left. Takagi enhanced his squad by recruiting former Japanese internationals Tatsuhiko Kubo and Daisuke Oku (both from Yokohama F. Marinos), and Gilmar Silva (from Tokyo Verdy).

They beat Marinos in a Yokohama derby in the second match of the season, but otherwise the things didn't go well for Takagi. New team leaders Oku and Kubo were sidelined due to injuries and the club was anchored at the bottom of the standing. The club signed high-profile former Japanese international midfielder Atsuhiro Miura in August. Apparently there was a conflict between the management and Takagi as he expressed disgruntlement on Miura's signing quoting that what the club needed at that point was a good defender or forward. He was sacked on August 27, 2007 and replaced by Brazilian Júlio César Leal.

Tokyo Verdy
In 2008, Takagi signed with Tokyo Verdy returned to J1 and he served as assistant coach under manager and his former international team mate Tetsuji Hashiratani in 2008. However Verdy was relegated to J2 in a year and Hashiratani resigned end of the season. Takagi was promoted to the manager as Hashiratani successor. However he was sacked for poor performance in October.

Roasso Kumamoto
He was appointed the manager of Roasso Kumamoto in 2010, and managed until his resignation after 2012 season.

V-Varen Nagasaki
On 20 December 2012, Takagi's local club V-Varen Nagasaki made an announcement that they appointed Takagi as the manager of newly promoted club to the 2013 J2 League. In 2017 season, the club won the 2nd place and was promoted to J1 first time in the club history. In 2018, V-Varen gain several players who Takagi's junior at his high school, Yuhei Tokunaga, Hokuto Nakamura and Kenta Tokushige. However the club finished at the bottom place and was relegated to J2, Takagi resigned end of the 2018 season.

Omiya Ardija
In 2019, Takagi signed with J2 club Omiya Ardija.

Career statistics

Club

International

Managerial statistics
Update; October 2, 2019

Honors
Japan
 1992 Asian Cup
 Dynasty Cup: 1992

Individual
 Dynasty Cup top scorer:1992

References

External links
 
 Japan National Football Team Database
 
 

1967 births
Living people
Osaka University of Commerce alumni
Association football people from Nagasaki Prefecture
Japanese footballers
Japan international footballers
Japan Soccer League players
J1 League players
J2 League players
Shonan Bellmare players
Sanfrecce Hiroshima players
Tokyo Verdy players
Hokkaido Consadole Sapporo players
1988 AFC Asian Cup players
1992 AFC Asian Cup players
1996 AFC Asian Cup players
AFC Asian Cup-winning players
Japanese football managers
J1 League managers
J2 League managers
J3 League managers
Yokohama FC managers
Tokyo Verdy managers
Roasso Kumamoto managers
V-Varen Nagasaki managers
Omiya Ardija managers
SC Sagamihara managers
Association football forwards
Footballers at the 1994 Asian Games
Asian Games competitors for Japan